The Sun Ultra series is a discontinued line of workstation and server computers developed and sold by Sun Microsystems, comprising two distinct generations. The original line was introduced in 1995 and discontinued in 2001. This generation was partially replaced by the Sun Blade in 2000 and that line was in itself replaced by the Sun Java Workstation—an AMD Opteron system—in 2004. In sync with the transition to x86-64-architecture processors, in 2005 the Ultra brand was later revived with the launch of the Ultra 20 and Ultra 40, albeit to some confusion, since they were no longer based on UltraSPARC processors.

History

Original model 

The original Ultra workstations and the Ultra Enterprise (later, "Sun Enterprise") servers were UltraSPARC-based systems produced from 1995 to 2001, replacing the earlier SPARCstation and SPARCcenter/SPARCserver series respectively. This introduced the 64-bit UltraSPARC processor and in later versions, lower-cost PC-derived technology, such as the PCI and ATA buses (the initial Ultra 1 and 2 models retained the SBus of their predecessors). The original Ultra range were sold during the dot com boom, and became one of the biggest selling series of computers ever developed by Sun Microsystems, with many companies and organisations—including Sun itself—relying on Sun Ultra products for years after their successor products were released.

Brand revival 
The Ultra brand was revived in 2005 with the launch of the Ultra 20 and Ultra 40 with x86-64-architecture.

x64-based Ultra systems remained in the Sun portfolio for five more years; the last one, the Intel Xeon-based Ultra 27, was retired in June 2010, thereby concluding the history of Sun as a workstation vendor.

Late SPARC models 
The SPARC-based Ultra 3 Mobile Workstation laptop was released in 2005 as well, but it would prove to be a short-lived design and was retired the next year. Its release did not coincide with the rest of the line as most of the brand had already moved on to x86.

Additionally, new Ultra 25 and Ultra 45 desktop UltraSPARC IIIi-based systems were introduced in 2006. 

In October 2008, Sun discontinued all these, effectively ending the production of SPARC architecture workstations. 

The original Ultra/Enterprise series itself was later replaced by the Sun Blade workstation and Sun Fire server ranges.

Sun Ultra models

Ultra workstations (1995–2001)

Ultra Enterprise/Enterprise servers

Entry-level

Note: the Enterprise 220R is an Ultra 60 motherboard in a rack-mountable server chassis with hot-swappable power supplies. Similarly, the Enterprise 420R is an Ultra 80 motherboard in a server chassis.

Mid-range and high-end

 = available as upgrade option only

Ultra workstations (2005–2010)
In the intervening time gap, Sun workstations were named Sun Blade and Sun Java Workstation.

UltraSPARC

The A60 Ultra 3 mobile workstation rebadged the Tadpole SPARCle (550 and 650 MHz) and Viper (1.2 GHz) laptops. The A61 Ultra 3 was physically different and was based on the Naturetech 888P (550/650 MHz) and Mesostation 999 (1.28 GHz). The two lines are unrelated systems otherwise.

x86

External links

Sun graphics cards

Sun servers
Sun workstations
Computer-related introductions in 1995
SPARC microprocessor products
64-bit computers